The Ministry of Agriculture is a government ministry which oversees the development of agriculture in Indonesia. It is headed by a Minister of Agriculture, who is directly responsible to President.

History
It was later renamed Department of Agriculture, Industry, and Trade in 1911 and Department of Economic Affairs in 1934. During the Japanese occupation, agriculture affairs are handled by Department of Industry, Military Government .

Following Indonesian independence, agriculture, trade and industry were under the Department of Welfare in Indonesia's first cabinet. The first Welfare Minister was Soerachman Tjokroadisoerjo. Ministry of Agriculture was officially formed on 6 September 1950. On First Working Cabinet, the "Ministry of Agriculture" was renamed into "Department of Agriculture". The name was reverted back into "Ministry of Agriculture" in 2009.

Organization
The Ministry of Agriculture structure followed its permanent constituting document, Presidential Decree No. 117/2022. The structure later expanded, recently, with Ministry of Agriculture Decree No. 19/2023.
 Office of the Minister of Agriculture
Office of the Deputy Minister of Agriculture
Office of the Secretariat General 
Bureau of Planning
Bureau of Organization and Employee
Bureau of Law Affairs
Bureau of Finance and State Property Management
Bureau of General Affairs and Procurement
Bureau of International Cooperation
Bureau of Public Relation and Public Relation
Centers
Center for Agricultural Data and Information System
Center for Plant Varieties Protection and Agricultural Licensing
Center for Agricultural Library and Literation
Center for Agriculture Socio Economic and Policy Studies
 Directorate General of Agricultural Infrastructure (DG I)
Office of the Director General of Agricultural Infrastructure
Office of the Secretary of Directorate General of Agricultural Infrastructure
Directorate of Agricultural Land Expansion and Protection
Directorate of Agricultural Irrigation
Directorate of Agricultural Funding
Directorate of Fertilizer and Pesticides
Directorate of Agricultural Tools and Machinery
 Directorate General of Food Crops (DG II)
Office of the Director General of Food Crops
Office of the Secretary of Directorate General of Food Crops
Directorate of Seed for Food Crops 
Directorate of Cerealia
Directorate of Legumes and Tuber Crops
Directorate of Food Crops Protection
Directorate of Food Crops Products Processing and Marketing
 Directorate General of Horticulture (DG III)
Office of the Director General of Horticulture
Office of the Secretary of Directorate General of Food Crops
Directorate of Seed for Horticulture 
Directorate of Fruits and Floriculture
Directorate of Vegetables and Medicinal Plants
Directorate of Horticulture Protection
Directorate of Horticulture Products Processing and Marketing 
 Directorate General of Plantations (DG IV)
Office of the Director General of Plantations
Office of the Secretary of Directorate General of Plantations
Directorate of Seed for Estate Crops
Directorate of Oil Palm and Palms
Directorate of Seasonal and Annual Plants
Directorate of Estate Crops Protection
Directorate of Estate Crops Products Processing and Marketing
 Directorate General of Livestock and Animal Health (DG V)
Office of the Director General of Livestock and Animal Health
Office of the Secretary of Directorate General of Livestock and Animal Health
Directorate of Seed for Livestock and Livestock Production
Directorate of Feed
Directorate of Animal Health
Directorate of Veterinary Public Health
Directorate of Animal Products Processing and Marketing
 Inspectorate General
Office of the Inspectorate General
Office of the Secretary of Inspectorate General
Inspectorate I (internal oversight for DG II and III)
Inspectorate II (internal oversight for DG I, Agency for Agricultural Extension and Human Resource Development)
Inspectorate III (internal oversight for DG IV, Indonesian Agency for Agricultural Quarantine, and Inspectorate General)
Inspectorate IV (internal oversight for DG V, General Secretariat, and Agricultural Instruments Standardization Agency)
Investigation Inspectorate
 Agricultural Instruments Standardization Agency
 Office of the Head of Agricultural Instruments Standardization Agency
Office of the Secretary of Agricultural Instruments Standardization Agency
 Center for Instruments Standardization of Food Crops
 Center for Instruments Standardization of Horticulture
 Center for Instruments Standardization of Plantations
 Center for Instruments Standardization of Animal Farms and Animal Health
 Agency for Agricultural Extension and Human Resource Development
 Office of the Head of Agency for Agricultural Extension and Human Resource Development
Office of the Secretary of Agency for Agricultural Extension and Human Resource Development
 Center for Agricultural Extensions
 Center for Agricultural Education
 Center for Agricultural Training
 Indonesian Agency for Agricultural Quarantine
 Office of the Head of Indonesian Agency for Agricultural Quarantine
Office of the Secretary of Indonesian Agency for Agricultural Quarantine
 Center for Animal Quarantine and Natural Animal Security
 Center for Plant Quarantine and Natural Plant Security
 Center for Quarantine Compliance, Cooperation, and Information
 Expert Staffs
Expert Staffs on Bio-industry Development
 Expert Staffs on Trade and International Relations
 Expert Staffs on Agricultural Investment
 Expert Staffs on Agricultural Environment
 Expert Staffs on Agricultural Infrastructure

References

See also

Agriculture
Indonesia
Agricultural organizations based in Indonesia